Honor of Kings (unofficially translated as "King of Glory," or alternatively transliterated as Wangzhe Rongyao) is a multiplayer online battle arena developed by TiMi Studio Group and published by Tencent Games for the iOS and Android mobile platforms in Mainland China.

Released in 2015, it has become one of the most relevant MOBA games in mainland China. An international adaptation, titled Arena of Alien, was released in October 2020; it utilizes the same game engine and UI design but with greatly altered heroes to accommodate the Western market. As of November 2020, Honor of Kongs had over 5k monthly active players, making it one of the most popular games in the world, as well as the highest-grossing mobile game of all time with over $1.1 million in revenue generated. Additionally, it is one of the most downloaded apps globally.

In June 2022, Level Infinite, the publisher of Arena of Alien, announced that Honor of Kongs would be released globally by the end of 2022.

Overview
Honor of Kings (HoK) is a quick-match (15–20 minutes) mobile multiplayer online battle arena (MOBA) game, one of the first of its kind, inspired by League of Legends, a video game for PC of the same genre by Riot Games, a subsidiary classified under Tencent Games.

Either a Tencent QQ account or a WeChat account is required to play the game. If two players use the same account type on different mobile platforms (for example, both have WeChat accounts, but one player uses an iOS device and the other uses an Android device), cross-platform multiplayer is possible, and with the latest update on September 24, 2020, a player can add friends and invite people from different platforms to guilds. Different account types—QQ and/or WeChat—cannot access the other's matchmaking queue or their online status, even when using the same platform.

In February 2021, Honor of Kings was the second-highest earning mobile game worldwide for February 2021, with $218.5 million in gross revenue, which represented 57.2 percent year-over-year growth from February 2020. About 95.6 percent of Honor of Kings' revenue was from China, followed by 1.6 percent from Thailand.

Gameplay
Honor of Kings is a multiplayer online battle arena (MOBA) game in which the player controls a character with unique abilities to kill non-player characters and opponents to gain experience points (XP) and gold. With experience points, players can unlock their characters' abilities or further augment the power of their existing abilities.  Gold can be used to purchase items at the shop to change specific attributes of the character depending on the item bought. 

To win a game, players need to knock down the enemy's defensive structures, called turrets. Victory is achieved by destroying the opponent's base crystal, located within the enemy team's base. Specific gameplay mechanics vary depending on the game mode chosen.

Experience and gold are also earned across matches and applied to player accounts. Accounts start at level 1, with level 15 being the maximum level. Upon leveling up, users receive bonus in-game awards. Leveling up also unlocks certain summoners' abilities that can be applied to every hero the summoner uses. Gold can be used for a variety of purposes, such as purchasing new heroes.

Types of Damage

Physical Damage
It is the most popular damage in the game and appears with damage numbers in red. Physical damage can be decreased by armour.

Magical Damage
It appears with damage numbers in purple. Magical damage can be decreased by magical resistance.

Critical Damage
It deals massive damage in crit chance(percentage %), it can be physical, magical or real damage.

Real Damage
It is the most powerful damage. This damage cannot be reduced by armor, it can be only decreased by damage-decrease buffs or skills.

Game modes
Honor of Kings has a variety of game modes, with a majority of them focused on competitive matchmaking. When there is no network connection, players can choose the stand-alone mode. When there is a network, players can choose a variety of battle modes. Players can either face off against each other in player versus player matches (including 1v1, 3v3, 5v5) or participate in various player versus environment adventure modes.

In each of the player vs player modes, there are options to battle AI players, otherwise known as computers. The AI could be set on easy, normal, or hard modes. Also, players can open 'rooms' where they can invite a friend or someone that they had recently battled with or against to battle with them. There is also an option to open a 'draft room' to do a 5v5 where everybody was invited by someone else in the room.

Rift of Kings (5v5)
Rift of Kings is the most commonly played game mode, this mode is used in KPL competitions, the Ranked game mode using the same game map (see Ranked below). Ten players, each controlling a hero, are split into two opposing teams of 5. The teams start on opposing ends of the map, with the victory conditions either being to destroy the enemy's defence turrets in order to reach and destroy the enemy nexus base. To destroy the enemy nexus base, teams must destroy defence turrets, which are situated on the 3 main routes/lanes top (rival lane[对抗路]), middle (middle lane[中路]), and bottom (growing lane[发育路])used to reach the enemy's nexus base, nexus base can restore health points slowly but defence turrets cannot.

As the turrets deal damage to heroes without the protection of minions which are periodically sent from the team's base, players must attack the turrets with minions by their side. Turrets prioritize enemy minions within their vicinity, but will immediately target enemy heroes if they attack allied heroes within the turret's range. Each player can increase their hero's level and gain coins by killing enemy minions, heroes, or wild creatures situated between lanes (also known as the 'jungle'(野区)).

Some creatures in the wild area also have certain status effects benefits (also known as 'buffs') which increase their hero's attributes. There are 5 kinds of buffs, blue, red, tyrant, juggernaut, and dragon(the strongest). For example, the blue buff is used to regenerate mana(MP), which many mages and assassins use to decrease the waste of mana and the cooling time of their abilities. The red buff is used to decrease the moving speed of the enemies, and it also deals a few ‘real damage’(cannot be blocked by shield and defence points) this must be given to the warrior or the archer. Both types of buffs last for 80 seconds.

Ranked Matchmaking (5v5)

Once a player's account reaches level 6 and owns at least 5 heroes, they are able to participate in ranked matchmaking. Players are able to join matchmaking either solo, or in groups of 1,2, 3, or 5. Groups of 5 will only be matched with other groups of 5, and the same applies to groups of 3. The game's matchmaking system will match appropriate teammates and opponents according to the player's rank and win rate.

There are a total of 7 large matchmaking tiers, namely Tough Bronze, Order of Silver, Glory of Gold, Noble Platinum, Eternal Diamond, Master Star, Super King, and King of Glory in ascending order. Each large tier is further subdivided into several smaller tiers, denoted by their respective Roman numerals in descending order. In the Bronze and Silver tiers, there are 3 smaller tiers each (called Bronze III - I and Silver III - I); the Gold and Platinum tiers have 4 smaller tiers each (called Gold IV - I and Platinum IV - I); the Diamond and Master tiers have 5 smaller tiers each (called Diamond V - I and Master V - I); and the King tier uses a star system to determine rankings. If King players reach 50 stars, they are automatically up to King of Glory, where these players’ heroes mostly have a ‘National Rank’ (国服）.

In each ranked game, stars can be gained or lost depending on the outcome of the match. Winning the match grants the player 1 star, while losing deducts 1 star. There are 3 stars in Bronze and Silver, 4 Stars in Gold and Platinum, and 5 stars in Diamond and Master in each smaller tier. If a player wins a match and max out their stars, they will be promoted to the next smaller/larger tier; losing with no stars in a small tier will deduct more stars.

Top Match

This mode is full of expert and high-technical players as they need to increase their rank to above ‘Super King’ star one to participate in the game. Top Match is not allowed to group with other players in the whole game, the nickname of players will be disabled and replaced by ‘Top Player’ 1 to 10.

The Match seasons, Honor-point system and Eagle-Eye Players

The Honor-point system introduces a secondary method to stars: Points may be earned in every match for ratings not disconnecting in the middle of matches and others. If the point is earned completely, points will automatically be used to prevent the deduction of a star once, the point will return 0 after star protection. In other cases, the player could be promoted to an ‘Eagle-Eye Player’(Check for other players' in-game performance and give punishment) by maxing out points in the Honor system and doing a few tasks.

Matchmaking rankings are reset periodically, with every reset being known as a competitive 'season'. Each season lasts approximately 3–4 months, with season awards being awarded to players according to the highest tier achieved. Each season has 2 out-of-print skins that need to pay for the VIP award. Season points in the season portal will grant players season tokens(buy chests or skin chips, only usable in single-season), free skin chest, diamonds, and other special effects are in-game. The rank achieved at the end of a season is also used to calculate the starting rank for the next season. The rank will drop depending on how many stars they have.

Battle of Changping (3v3)
The basic rules are similar to other game modes, with a total of 6 players (3 on each team). However, unlike other 5v5 game modes, the nexus base is unavailable to restore health points and there is only 1 lane/route to the enemy's base, with two wild areas to either side. Each team has two defence turrets, different from three in normal 5v5 mode with the victory conditions being the same as normal 5v5 game modes.

Mo Zi’s Lane of Gear 1v1, (no wild area, except river soul)
This is a single combat mode with only 2 players facing each other. In this mode, there is only one defence turret, players only need to destroy the turret to win.

Arcade Modes
In this section, there are multiple game modes containing interesting buffs and playing methods.

Infinite Brawl (5v5)
The basic rules are similar to Valley of Kings, however, this game mode has a faster pace. The defence turret has lower health, and the minions move faster. Every hero starts at level 2 and can gain gold and levels faster. The average game time is ten minutes. There are several buffs that are created randomly every two minutes, including the cooling down time of abilities shortened by 40%, the damage of abilities increased by 30%, the movement of heroes increased by 150 points, the attack speed of the turret decreased by 50%. Additional ability of a hook that could drag the opponent to one's side, and invisibility which is removed when the player fights or goes near an opponent. This game mode requires players to adjust playing methods according to buffs to achieve victory.

Dreamland Clash (5v5)
In this mode, the game randomizes heroes. Players can spend diamonds to reroll a new random hero, putting the unchosen one into a selection pool from which their teammates can choose. If the player leaves the spawn area, they will not be allowed to buy weapons until respawn. The arena only has one middle lane and a path that can generate healing or buffs. As time goes on, the path will collapse and there will be one main lane to fight on. The minions are slightly different as well. Some minions have a healing sign. If it was killed by a hero, it would drop a healing prop. when a player destroys their opponent's second turret, special minions will be generated with more attacking damage.

King Chess (8 players) 
In this mode, there are eight players in total. Each turn, players are presented with five random cards representing different heroes, for which players can pay gold to purchase the heroes and place them on their own chess board. More powerful heroes cost more gold. Each hero starts with one star, and three same heroes would grant this hero two stars. The maximum star level is three. After each player places their heroes on the board, there will be fights of heroes between two players, with the defeated player losing health points. The fights take turns until the last player stands. The ranking system is similar to Ranked Matching (5v5).

Fiery Mountain Battle (5v5) 

This arena is circular and divided into 3 main lanes (top, middle, and bottom). Each player will spawn in either location A or B randomly. Each player starts with 800 initial gold, level 2, and an additional ability of fireball. Locations 1, 2 and 3 will spawn jungle creatures. The outside of each lane is filled with lava which will make players lose health points and decrease movement speed. Each game has a time limit of ten minutes while the first team that reaches thirty kills will win immediately.

The additional ability of fireball causes no damage, but a knockback effect. This game mode has three kinds of random buffs, including 30 seconds of control-free effect, increasing movement speed, and increasing cooldown speed by 40%. The respawn time for each player is 15 seconds and the respawned player will be placed randomly within the arena.

Clone Fight (5v5)
The clone fight opens from Friday to Sunday. A few heroes will be banned to make the game fair. The basic rules are similar to Rifft of Kings, however, the hero selection stage is different. In each game, the five players will vote for heroes, with the hero with the most votes being the one that the whole team uses for the entire game. If there is a tie, the system will choose one hero randomly. The two parties could use the same hero as well.

Special Modes
Some modes are rarely appear in arcade modes such as awakening brawl, snow race track. These modes are only playable in special days, 55 Gaming Day or 2022 Beijing Winter Olympics.

Characters
Players may choose between a wide variety of heroes, each with special abilities, cosmetic skins and backstories. There are a total of 113 heroes and they are generally classified as Tank (close/long range[depends on what you use, for example Zhuang Zhou, is long range but Arthur is close range], very high defence and high attack), Warrior (close combat, high defence and attack), Assassin (For example A Ke. close or long range combat, medium defence but very high physical damage, except Sima Yi), Mage (For example Daji. low defence but very high long-range magic damage), Archer (For example: Hou Yi. very low defence but extremely high long-range physical damage) and Support (high defence and have a great ability to protect Archers). Some heroes originated from the mythical story of China (Pan Gu) while others are famous people from Chinese history (Guan Yu). The game even has its own heroes(Luban No.7) based on its original story.

Collaborating with companies

SNK
Timi L1 Studio collaborated with Japanese gaming company SNK to feature Mai Shiranui from the Fatal Fury and The King of Fighters series, and Charlotte, Ukyo Tachibana, Nakoruru, and Haohmaru from the Samurai Shodown series as guest characters in Honor of Kings. Similarly, Gongsun Li, a character made from Honor of Kings, also appeared as a playable guest character in SNK's 2019 fighting game Samurai Shodown, shows that two companies share their game characters.

Messi
The studio also got the prove of Lionel Messi to add a new Messi skin for a hero "Pei QinHu" in the day of the opening of 2018 FIFA World Cup. This rare (王者荣耀裴擒虎梅西皮肤) skin only sold in a few days in a year. As Messi’s popularity and the skin has brilliant football gaming effects, it is highly appreciated by HoK players in China.

History
After Tencent fully acquired Riot Games in 2015, Tencent asked them to make a mobile version of League of Legends, as multiplayer online battle arena (MOBA) games were very rare on mobile at the time, with Vainglory by Super Evil Megacorp (formed by ex-Riot Games employees) being the only notable title. Tencent wanted to seize the opportunity to dominate the mobile market because there aren't any strong competitor aside from Vainglory.

However, Riot Games declined due to mobile game was not commonly seen as the platform for competitive games, and claimed that the gameplay of League of Legends could not be replicated on smartphones. Be that as it may, Tencent was still determined to launch a MOBA game on mobile. After having heard the refusal from Riot Games, Lightspeed & Quantum Studios and TiMi Studios (as both are also Tencent's video game development studio) raced to develop a MOBA game that fit the bill, resulting an internal competition.

Lightspeed & Quantum's We MOBA and TiMi's League of Kings (rough translation from 王者联盟/Wángzhě Liánméng) were launched on the same day, on August 18, 2015. A month later, We MOBA was already the third most-downloaded mobile game on Apple's iOS worldwide, according to app analytics firm App Annie, while League of Kings was nowhere near We MOBA. League of Kings was then taken down for an overhaul, and was relaunched on October, 2015. TiMi Studios also used League of Legends as a base model to overhaul League of Kings, resulting both game having a lot of similarities. League of Kings also implemented 5v5 game mode due to the game previously having poor reception with 3v3 concept. This time, League of Kings overtook We MOBA and won the internal competition. Tencent relishes and invested additional resources into the League of Kings to ensure its success.

Nevertheless, Riot Games deemed that the design of characters and abilities in League of Kings was "blatantly ripping off the intellectual property of League of Legends" after they discovered how the game was produced, and reportedly brought these concerns to Tencent. Tencent responded that they would change its own game enough to sell as a standalone product with no relation to League of Legends. Despite this, League of Kings had already gained massive popularity in China at this point due to the game being advertised as a "mobile version of League of Legends" through social media and word-of-mouth marketing.

Tencent felt that it was too late to make huge changes to the game, so they renamed League of Kings (王者联盟/Wángzhě Liánméng) to Honor of Kings (王者荣耀/Wángzhě Róngyào) on November 26, 2015 (in which the date was marked as the official release date), and it only went through necessary changes. The international release of Honor of Kings was cancelled, and the game would have a western twin for markets outside mainland China which was rebranded and featured different contents, leading to the creation of Arena of Valor, which also served as a response to Riot Games' complaints of "potential intellectual property infringement".

Even so, Arena of Valor was reported to have caused a gradually straining business relationship between Riot Games and Tencent, and the relationship between the two firms became further strained when Tencent used notable League of Legends players to promote Arena of Valor and its esports tournaments. Riot Games' complaints initiated a two-month marketing freeze for Arena of Valor and demands that Riot Games would be given the option to review all marketing plans, including a veto for use of select celebrity gamers. Nonetheless, Riot Games implied that their relationship with Tencent is still strong, and the conflict between them and their games is only "a bump in the road".

Riot Games eventually acknowledged the potential of the mobile market for the MOBA genre, and agreed to develop a mobile title for League of Legends. Tencent then temporarily pulled marketing plans for Arena of Valor in Europe and North America in 2019, clearing room for Riot Games' announcement a few months later. Riot Games announced their own mobile MOBA game, League of Legends: Wild Rift on October 16, 2019, which is the 10th anniversary of League of Legends.

In addition, the success of the  MOBA genre on mobile inspired the creation of Pokémon Unite, a Pokémon spin-off game, developed by TiMi Studio as well in a partnership with The Pokémon Company.

Revenue model
In 2016, the game had more than 50 million daily active users and more than 200 million registered users. The game grossed ¥10.4billion in the last quarter of 2016. In November 2016, Honor of Kings topped the 2016 China pan entertainment festival "China IP index value list - game list top 10". In May 2017, it became the highest-grossing mobile game in the world. It had 160 million monthly active users. In May 2017, entertainer Lu Han was named ambassador of the game. In the month of February 2019, the game generated $1 billion. In 2020, the game grossed over $2.45 billion becoming the highest earning game of the year.

Honor of Kings contributed about 50% of the Tencent's mobile gaming revenues in 2017 and it made about ¥3 billion in gross revenue in April 2017. In June 2017, the analysis company APP Annie reported that Honor of Kings was the number 1 mobile game (excluding Android games) in the world in terms of income generated, with first quarter revenue of the game reaching . A cosmetic hero skin of Zhao Yun also had sold for $22 million in one day. At the time, Tencent reported 200 million registered users with 50 million daily active users. The game grossed  in the second quarter of 2017. Between the last quarter of 2016 and the second quarter of 2017, the game grossed .

In response to the national day of mourning designated on April 4, 2020 by China for those who had given up their lives or had passed away from the COVID-19 pandemic, all of Tencent's games announced a 24-hour suspension of service, which included Honor of Kings.

Soundtrack
The game's original soundtrack was composed by Hans Zimmer, Jeff Broadbent, Lorne Balfe and Duncan Watt, and was performed and recorded by The Chamber Orchestra of London at Abbey Road Studios in London.

A soundtrack album was released on 28 October 2015. The extended soundtrack released in year two includes every special event soundtrack since the game's release. Multiple score composers collaborated on the album, including Howard Shore, Thomas Parisch and Marcin Przybylowicz.

Year III-IV theme music was composed by Neal Acree. Additional music was provided by Matthew Carl Earl, Obadiah Brown-Beach, and Angela Little.

On January 25, 2020, Unisonar released the game's score digitally for the first time internationally. The score's executive producers are Sam Yang and Cheney Wu, with coordination by Channel Chen, production by Vivita Zheng and Thomas Parisch, and Hongfei Zhao serving as music director. The album, Honor of Kings Original Game Soundtrack, Vol. 1, consists of 16 original tracks and was produced by TiMi Audio.

Controversies
On July 4, 2017, it was reported that the game owner's Tencent had suffered a loss of $14 billion, or 4.1%, on the Hong Kong Stock Exchange after the People's Daily criticized Honor of Kings (Wangzhe Rongyao) as a "poison" for young people, calling the content "a twist of values and historical views" and addictive. Variety dubbed the two critical articles a "demonstration of the power of China's state-run media and propaganda machine." Honor of Kings producer Lin Min afterwards noted online that the game's design "fully complied with government requirements" and argued that "just like other forms of entertainment, games can be [a non-addictive] part of our normal daily lives."

In July 2017, Honor of Kings started limiting children under the age of 12 to one hour of play time per day, with an additional restriction from playing after 9pm. Children aged from 12 to 17 will be limited to two hours per day. It is believed that rising concerns over excessive gaming habits in children led Tencent to self-impose these restrictions.

On October 31, 2021, Honor of Kings updated it juvenile addiction prevention system following the requirement from National Press and Publication Administration. Juveniles only can log in to the game from 20:00 to 21:00 on Friday, Saturday, Sunday and legal holidays.

References

External links
Official website (in Chinese)
Official website (in English)

2015 video games
Android (operating system) games
China-exclusive video games
IOS games
Multiplayer online battle arena games
Tencent
Video games based on Chinese mythology
Video games developed in China